Fred "Lefty" Bell (March 19, 1902 - October 11, 1936) was an American baseball pitcher in the Negro leagues. He played from 1923 to 1927, and again in 1932, playing with several teams. He was the brother of Cool Papa Bell.

References

External links

 and Baseball-Reference Black Baseball stats and Seamheads

1902 births
1936 deaths
Kansas City Monarchs players
St. Louis Stars (baseball) players
St. Louis Giants (1924) players
Detroit Stars players
Montgomery Grey Sox players
Toledo Tigers players
Baseball players from Mississippi
Sportspeople from Starkville, Mississippi
Baseball pitchers
20th-century African-American sportspeople